Gil Morales, known professionally as Ate Gay (born August 12, 1971), is a Filipino actor, comedian, impersonator and singer. 
In November 2012, he accomplished his first major arena concert in SM Mall of Asia Arena, titled Ako Naman... Ate Gay sa Arena. The concert was sold out and turned out successful.

In March 2013, Ate Gay became controversial to the backstage shouting incident that happened in the variety TV show Wowowillie with himself, Willie Revillame and Ethel Booba.

Filmography

Television

Film

References

External links

1960 births
Living people
Filipino gay actors
Gay comedians
21st-century Filipino male actors
Filipino male comedians
Filipino male television actors
Filipino television personalities
People from Manila
Filipino male film actors
21st-century Filipino LGBT people
ABS-CBN personalities
GMA Network personalities
TV5 (Philippine TV network) personalities